Aversa Cathedral (Cattedrale di San Paolo) is a Roman Catholic cathedral in the city of Aversa in the province of Caserta, Campania, Italy.

History
It has been the seat of the Bishop of Aversa from the bishopric's foundation in 1053.

The Romanesque cathedral, dedicated to Saint Paul, has a spectacular ambulatory and an octagonal dome. Francesco Solimena's Madonna of the Gonfalone is kept here; the Martyrdom of Saint Sebastian by the Quattrocento painter Angiolillo Arcuccio, now in the seminary, was here formerly. The pre-Romanesque sculpture of Saint George and the Dragon is one of the few surviving free-standing sculptures of its date. An outstanding collection of Baroque liturgical silver is kept in the treasury.

Sources
 Italian dioceses
 Catholic Hierarchy: Diocese of Aversa
 Catholic Encyclopedia: Diocese of Aversa

References

External links

Roman Catholic cathedrals in Italy
Cathedral
Cathedrals in Campania
Churches in the province of Caserta
Buildings and structures in the Province of Caserta